Edward Martin Dyson (21 October 1935 – 22 December 2019) was an English cricketer and schoolmaster who played first-class cricket for Oxford University from 1958 to 1960.

Martin Dyson attended Queen Elizabeth Grammar School, Wakefield, from 1947 to 1954, before going up to Keble College, Oxford. A batsman who sometimes opened the innings, he made his highest first-class score of 68 not out in Oxford's innings victory over Free Foresters in 1960.

After leaving Oxford he taught at St Paul's School in London, Eton College, and Ludgrove School in Berkshire. He and his wife Evelyn had a son and a daughter.

References

External links
 
 Martin Dyson at CricketArchive

1935 births
2019 deaths
People from Wakefield
People educated at Queen Elizabeth Grammar School, Wakefield
Alumni of Keble College, Oxford
English cricketers
Oxford University cricketers
Marylebone Cricket Club cricketers
Schoolteachers from London
Teachers at Eton College